Who Made the Potatoe Salad? is a 2006 romantic comedy film directed by Damon Daniels and starring Jaleel White and Jennia Frederique.

Premise
Michael, A San Diego policeman, travels to Los Angeles for Thanksgiving with his fiancée, Ashley (played by Jennia Fredrique), to meet her dysfunctional family and announce their engagement. While there Michael is subjected to ridicule by his fiancés father and brother for being a cop. Michael learns that his soon to be new father in law was a member of the black panther party and went to prison for attempted murder of a police officer but maintains it was self defense so he hates cops.

Cast
Jaleel White as Michael
Jennia Fredrique as Ashley Jenkins
Clifton Powell as Jake Jenkins
Ella Joyce as Mrs. Jenkins
DeRay Davis as June Bug
Mark Chalant Phifer as Ray Ray
Daphne Bloomer as Mookie
Terrance Thomas as Lil Ray
Reynaldo Rey as Mr. Brown
Bebe Drake as Mrs. Brown
Eddie Griffin as Malik
Tommy Lister as Monster
Gary Owen as Police Officer
 Michael Colyar as Old Man #1 in Park

References

External links
 
 

2006 films
2006 romantic comedy films
Films about dysfunctional families
Films set in Los Angeles
Thanksgiving in films
Films set in San Diego
2000s English-language films